The pallid spiny softshell turtle (Apalone spinifera pallida) is a subspecies of softshell turtle native to the U.S. states of Oklahoma, Louisiana and Texas. It was first described by Robert G. Webb in 1962.

References 

Turtle Field Guide: Spiny Softshell Subspecies

Apalone
Reptiles of the United States
Fauna of the Plains-Midwest (United States)
Reptiles described in 1962
Taxa named by Robert G. Webb